There are many notable music festivals in the United Kingdom, covering a wide variety of genres, which are usually run from late May to early September. Some are world-renowned and have been held for many years, including the world's largest greenfield festival, Glastonbury, which has been held since the 1970s.

History

Large-scale modern music festivals began in the 1960s with festivals such as the Isle of Wight Festival and following the success of Woodstock in the United States and free festivals. Some began as jazz festivals such as the Reading Festival which began as the National Jazz and Blues Festival in the 1960s and the first Glastonbury Festival was the 1970 Pilton Pop, Blues & Folk Festival.

In the 21st century the number of festivals has grown significantly,

Events

Bluegrass 
 Didmarton Bluegrass Festival

Classical and opera

 Aldeburgh Festival
 BBC Cardiff Singer of the World
 Buxton Festival
 Cheltenham Music Festival
 Cymanfa Ganu
 East Neuk Festival
 Edinburgh International Festival
 English Music Festival
 Garsington Opera
 Glyndebourne Opera Festival
 Grange Park Opera
 Grimeborn 
 Harrogate International Festivals
 Henley Festival
 Huddersfield Contemporary Music Festival
 Llangollen International Musical Eisteddfod
 Lake District Summer Music
 London International Festival of Early Music
 Nevill Holt Opera
 Oxford Lieder Festival
 The Proms
 Prom on The Close
 Spitalfields Music
 St Albans International Organ Festival
 St Magnus Festival
 Southern Cathedrals Festival
 Swaledale Festival
 Three Choirs Festival
 Two Moors Festival
 York Early Music Festival

Country

C2C: Country to Country

Dance and Electronic

 Bang Face 
 Beat-Herder
 Bestival
 Bloc Festival
 Boardmasters
 Chilled in a Field Festival
 Creamfields
 Glade Festival
 Infest UK
 Live at Loch Lomond
 PlanetLove
 Play Fest
 Shambala Festival

Ethnic
 Africa Oyé
 Bradford Mela
 Cardiff Mela
 Edinburgh Mela

Folk

 Beverley Folk Festival
 Big Burns Supper Festival
 BunkFest
 Cambridge Folk Festival
 Celtic Connections
 Cropredy Festival
 Folk East
 Hop Farm Festival (inactive)
 International Eisteddfod
 IVFDF
 Middlewich Folk And Boat Festival
 Royal National Mòd
 Shrewsbury Folk Festival
 Sidmouth Folk Festival
 Soma Festival, Castlewellan
 Towersey Festival
 Trowbridge Village Pump Festival
 Glasgow West End Festival
 Wickham Festival

Jazz
 Brecon Jazz Festival
 Cheltenham Jazz Festival
 City of Derry Jazz and Big Band Festival
 Glasgow Jazz Festival
 Glenn Miller Festival
 London Jazz Festival
 Love Supreme Jazz Festival

Metal
 Bloodstock Open Air
 Damnation Festival
 Deathfest
 Download Festival
 Hammerfest
 Hard Rock Hell
 Hellfire Festival
 High Voltage Festival
 In-Fest
 Ozzfest
 ProgPower UK
 Sonisphere Festival

Pop
 Guernsey Festival Of Performing Arts
 Jack Up The Summer Festival
 Jersey Live
 Jingle Bell Ball
 Midlands Music Festival
 Osfest
 Party in the Park
 Summertime Ball
 T in the Park
 T4 on the Beach

Punk
 Common Ground Festival
 Give it a Name Festival
 Rebellion Festival
 Slam Dunk Festival

Rock

 Boardmasters
 Bourne Festival
 Damnation Festival
 Download Festival
 Forfey Festival
 Headlander Festival
 Hevy Music Festival
 High Voltage Festival
 Isle of Wight Festival
 Jersey Live
 Marvellous Festivals
 Play Fest
 Projekt Revolution
 Ramblin' Man Fair
 Sonisphere Festival
 Stamford Festival
 Summer Sundae
 Garden Party Festival
 TRNSMT
 Tennents ViTal
 Uxfest
 Whitby Gothic Weekend
 Walk the Line Festival

Tribute act festivals
Glastonbudget
Marvellous Festivals

Cross-genre

 Lytham Festival
110 Above Festival (formerly Lainfest)
2000 Trees Festival
 All Tomorrow's Parties
 ArtsFest (inactive)
 BBC Radio 1's Big Weekend (Traveling)
 Bearded Theory Festival
 Beautiful Days
 Beggars Fair
 Bestival
 Big in Falkirk (inactive)
 Blissfields
 Boardmasters
 The Bollington Festival
 Boomtown
 Brentwood Festival
 British Summer Time
 Brownstock Festival
 Camp Bestival
 Cardiff Big Weekend
 Celtic Blue Rock Community Arts Festival
 City of London Festival
 Clarence Park Festival
 End of the Road Festival
 Evolution Emerging
 Evolution Festival
 Fairport's Cropredy Convention
 Farmfestival
 Festival Too
 Field Day
 Forest Tour
 Fusion Festival
 Garforth Arts Festival
 Glastonbury Festival
 Godiva Festival
 The Great Escape Festival
 Greenbelt festival
 Green Man Festival
 Guilfest
 Hampton Court Palace Festival
 Hastings Musical Festival
 HowTheLightGetsIn
 Isle of Wight Festival
 Kendal Calling
 Killin Music Festival
 Knebworth Festival
 Knockengorroch Festival
 Larmer Tree Festival
 Latitude Festival
 LeeStock Music Festival
Let's Rock
 Limetree Festival
 Lindisfarne Festival
 Mathew Street Fringe Festival
 Looe Music Festival
 Loopallu Festival
 Lounge On The Farm (inactive)
 The Magic Loungeabout (inactive)
 Marvellous Festivals
 Meltdown
 Monmouth Music Festival
 Montrose Music Festival
 Norfolk and Norwich Festival
 Nozstock
 Offset Festival
 Outlines Festival
 The Outsider Festival (inactive)
 Oxjam
 Parklife
 Phoenix Festival (inactive)
 Play Fest
 Reading and Leeds Festivals
 Redfest
 Rewind Festival 
 Rhythm Festival (inactive)
 Rise Festival (inactive)
 RockNess (inactive)
 Rotherham Real Ale and Music Festival
 Scarborough Fair Festival
 St. Magnus International Festival
 Stamford Riverside Festival
 Strawberry Fair 
 Seahouses Festival
 Secret Garden Party
 Sellindge Music Festival
 Sesiwn Fawr Dolgellau
 Sheep Music
 Shifnal Festival
 Skye Music Festival (inactive)
 Solfest
 Splendour in Nottingham
 Standon Calling
 Sunrise Celebration
 Supersonic Festival
 Sŵn Festival
 T in the Park
 Tartan Heart Festival
 Tafwyl
 Tramlines Festival
 Truck Festival
 Twinwood Festival
 Underage Festival (inactive)
 V Festival
 Vale Festival
 Victorious Festival
 Wakestock
 Walk the Line Festival
 Weyfest
 Whitwell Music Festival
 Wickerman Festival (inactive)
 Wickham Festival
 Wireless Festival
 WOMAD
 Worcester Music Festival
 Wychwood Music Festival
 Y Not Festival
 Young London into Music

See also
 List of festivals in the United Kingdom

References

Bibliography
 Andrew Blake (1997). The Land Without Music: Music, Culture and Society in Twentieth Century Britain. Manchester: Manchester University Press. .
 George McKay (2000). Glastonbury: A Very English Fair, inc. chapter one "Histories of festival culture", also "Timeline of British pop festival culture". London: Victor Gollancz. .
 George McKay (2005). Circular Breathing: The Cultural Politics of Jazz in Britain, chapter one "New Orleans jazz, protest (Aldermaston) and carnival (Beaulieu [Jazz Festival 1956–60])". Durham NC: Duke University Press. .

External links
 
 
 
 
 
 
 

British music-related lists
United Kingdom
United Kingdom
Lists of festivals in the United Kingdom